Christian Søren Marcus Olrik (October 13, 1815 -	December 14, 1870) was a Danish Greenlander professor, zoologist, botanist, and Royal Inspector of North Greenland.

Biography
Olrik was born at Julianehåb, Greenland.
He was the son of Vilhelm Mathias Olrik (1780-1833) and Lea Kirstine Geraae (1794-1828). 
He became a student at Borgerdydskolen in Copenhagen in 1833.
He began his teaching career for the next nine years. 
He returned to Greenland and was appointed Inspector of the North in 1846 after his brother-in-law, Hans Peter Christian Møller (1810-45) had died in office. 
 
During his tenure as inspector he encouraged the self-sufficiency of the Greenlandic economy and was a member of the Greenland Trade Commission. He held on to the position for 20 years before returning again to Copenhagen. He was a popular contact for scientific expeditions to Greenland, as he was a trained and experienced botanist.

Olrik was elected to the American Philosophical Society in 1856.

Legacy
Olrik Fjord in NW Greenland was named after him.
Three animal species are named after Olrik; a poacher, a tapeworm, and a leech.

Personal life
He was married in 1846 to Sophie Møller (1820-1862). 
He was married in 1863 with Margrethe Elisabeth Møller (1812-1902) sister of his 1st wife.

See also
 List of inspectors of Greenland

References

19th-century Danish botanists
Inspectors of Greenland
1815 births
1870 deaths
19th-century Danish zoologists
History of the Arctic